The Peggy Glanville-Hicks Address is an annual forum for ideas relating to the creation and performance of Australian music. It was named for the Australian composer Peggy Glanville-Hicks.

From 1999 until 2018 the Peggy Glanville-Hicks Address was managed by the New Music Network. Since 2019 the event has been managed by the Australian Music Centre.

Lecturers

1999: James Murdoch
2000: Barry Conyngham AM
2001: Liza Lim
2002: Roland Peelman AM
2003: John Davis
2004: Julian Burnside AO
2005: Richard Mills AM
2006: Daryl Buckley
2007: Jon Rose
2008: Sandy Evans
2009: Robyn Archer AO
2010: Simone Young AM
2011: Lyndon Terracini AM
2012: Michael Kieran Harvey
2013: Genevieve Lacey
2014: Warren Burt
2015: Richard Gill AO 
2016: Nicole Canham
2017: Kim Williams AM
2018: Cat Hope
2019: Deborah Cheetham AO 
2020: Madeleine Flynn and Tim Humphrey; Sunny Kim
2021: Sia Ahmad, Bree van Reyk, Zela Margossian
2022: Dr Anita Collins and William Barton

References

External links
"Peggy Glanville-Hicks Address", Australian Music Centre

Lecture series
Classical music in Australia
Recurring events established in 1999
1999 establishments in Australia
Annual events in Australia
Classical music lists
Australian music-related lists